Subdivisions of Libya have varied significantly over the last two centuries. Initially Libya under Ottoman and Italian control was organized into three to four provinces, then into three governorates (muhafazah) and after World War II into twenty-five districts (baladiyah). Successively into thirty-two districts (shabiyat) with three administrative regions, and then into twenty-two districts (shabiyat). In 2012 the ruling General National Congress  divided the country into governorates (muhafazat) and districts (baladiyat).  While the districts have been created, the governorates have not.

History
Prior to the Italian invasion of 1911, the area of Libya was administered as three separate provinces ("Vilayets") of the Ottoman Empire: Tripolitania, Fezzan, and Cyrenaica.

At first, Italy continued the tripartite administration, but soon consolidated the area into a single province/gobernatorate administered as the "Libyan Colony".  Indeed, until about 1931 -when the last of the native resistance to the Italians was subdued- the area was divided into three historical regions (Tripolitania, Cyrenaica and Fezzan/"Territorio Sahara").

Then, in 1937, Italian governor Italo Balbo created the political entity called Libya. His Italian Libya was with four provinces and one territory: Tripoli, Misurata, Benghazi, Derna, (in the coastal north) and the "Territory of the Libyan Sahara" (in the Saharan south).

After the French and British occupied Libya in 1943, it was again split into three provinces: Tripolitania in the northwest, Cyrenaica in the east, and Fezzan-Ghadames in the southwest.

After independence, Libya was divided into three governorates (muhafazat), matching the three provinces of before, but in 1963 it was divided into ten governorates.

Provinces

The Provinces of Libya existed during the last period of colonial Italian Libya through post-independence Libya. The country was divided into provinces from 1934 in the colonial era to 1963 when the Governorates system was instituted.

Governorates

The Governorates of Libya (muhafazah) were an administrative division of Libya from 1963 until 1983. Initially there were 46 governorates-districts, called baladiyah, that were reduced to 25 in 1987.

Baladiyat

In 1983, a new system was introduced dividing the country into forty-six districts (baladiyat also sometimes translated as municipalities). In 1987 this number was reduced to twenty-five. 

In Libya there are currently 106 districts, second level administrative subdivisions known as baladiyat (singular baladiyah).  The number has varied since 2013 between 99 and 108.

Districts

On 2 August 1995, Libya reorganized into thirteen districts (sha`biyat - singular sha`biyah, also translated as municipalities or popularates). In 1998 this was increased to twenty-six districts (sha`biyat). In 2001 it was increased to thirty-two districts plus three administrative regions.  Finally in 2007 the number was reduced to twenty-two districts.

Basic People's Congresses

Under Gaddafi Libyan districts were further subdivided into Basic People's Congresses  (Mu'tamar shaʿbi asāsi ).  Geographically they corresponded approximately to the level of a township or borough.  In desert areas they often had an extensive land area with very low population, and were generally centered on, and named for, an oasis.

Overview

See also
Districts of Libya
Governorates of Libya
Provinces of Libya
Basic People's Congress

Notes

 
Libya
Libya